Mont Gelé (3,518 m) is a mountain of the Pennine Alps, located on the border between Switzerland (canton of Valais) and Italy (region of Aosta Valley). It lies between the valleys of Bagnes and Valpelline, on the main Alpine watershed. It overlooks the Fenêtre de Durand from the east side.

It is one of the two mountains named Mont Gelé surrounding the valley of Bagnes, the other being located near Verbier.

See also
 Refuge Crête Sèche

References

External links

 Mont Gelé on Summitpost

Mountains of the Alps
Alpine three-thousanders
Mountains of Switzerland
Mountains of Aosta Valley
Italy–Switzerland border
International mountains of Europe
Mountains of Valais
Bagnes